Estadio Prof. Dr. José Vieira de Carvalho is a multi-use stadium in Maia, Portugal.  It is currently used mostly for football matches and is the home stadium of FC Maia. The stadium is able to hold 16,000 people.

The stadium is named after , a university professor and former president of the Municipality of Maia.

Portugal national football team
The national team played one match in this stadium, in 1990.

Sports venues in Porto District
Maia, Portugal
American football venues in Portugal
Football venues in Portugal
Multi-purpose stadiums in Portugal
Athletics (track and field) venues in Portugal